Prempeh may refer to:

 Prempeh I (1870-1931), Asante ruler
 Prempeh II, succeeding ruler of Asante
 Prempeh College, a boarding school in Ghana
 Jerry Prempeh (born 1988), French footballer

es:Prempeh